USB stands for Universal Serial Bus, a computer bus standard.

USB may also refer to:

Science and technology
 Upper sideband, of an AM signal
 Unified S-band communication for the Apollo program
 Unseptbium, symbol Usb, a theorized chemical element

Organisations
 Save Bessarabia Union (Uniunea Salvați Basarabia), Moldovan political party
 Simón Bolívar University (Venezuela), (Universidad Simón Bolívar), Caracas, Venezuela
 Simón Bolívar University (Mexico), (Universidad Simón Bolívar), Mexico City
 Union Savings Bank, Connecticut, US
 University Hospital of Basel, (Universitätsspital Basel), Switzerland
 U.S. Bancorp, NYSE ticker symbol
 USB Corporation, life science products company
 United Soybean Board, US
 Universal Studios Beijing, China

See also
 USB hardware
 USB hub
 Wireless USB
 USB flash drive